Herbert Zimmermann (born 1 July 1954) is a former German football player.

Club career 
A successful striker, Zimmermann was signed by FC Bayern Munich and also appeared as central defender for 1. FC Köln, the club he joined after he did not get enough games at Bayern. Injury worries of his new club made him appear as defender and doing well on that adopted position prevented him from giving up his new role. After being just part of the squad of FC Bayern Munich that won the Bundesliga in 1973 and 1974, and the European Cup in 1974, Zimmermann was a vital figure for Köln in Köln's DFB-Pokal wins in 1977 and 1983.

In 1978, he and his club even won the DFB-Pokal and the Bundesliga title (a double), his greatest achievement as a regular on club level. Hampered by injuries in his final years in the game, Zimmermann played in 204 Bundesliga matches (22 goals).

International career 
As defender he debuted for West Germany in a friendly at Wales in October 1976. His career for his country was in best prime in 1978 and 1979, years where he won the vast majority of his altogether 14 caps. In 1979, he even found the net, scoring vital goals in 1980 UEFA European Championship qualifiers against Wales and Turkey. These goals brought him a call-up to the 1980 UEFA European Championship winning squad of his nation, not knowing that the mentioned qualifying fixture against Turkey would remain his final cap. In Italy he wasn't used because of an injury. Two years earlier, in 1978, he had been with West Germany at the FIFA World Cup in Argentina, taking part against Poland and dropping out injured in the second half of the goalless draw against Italy at Estadio Monumental Antonio Vespucio Liberti in Buenos Aires.

References

External links
 
 
 
 

1954 births
Living people
German footballers
West German footballers
Germany international footballers
Germany B international footballers
FC Bayern Munich footballers
1. FC Köln players
UEFA Euro 1980 players
1978 FIFA World Cup players
UEFA European Championship-winning players
Bundesliga players
Association football forwards
Association football central defenders
People from Neuwied
Footballers from Rhineland-Palatinate